Scythris nanophyti is a moth species of the family Scythrididae. It was described by Mark I. Falkovitsh in 1979. It is found in Uzbekistan.

References

nanophyti
Moths described in 1979
Moths of Asia